The 1937 World Table Tennis Championships men's doubles was the eleventh edition of the men's doubles championship.
Jimmy McClure and Buddy Blattner won a second successive title after defeating Richard Bergmann and Helmut Goebel in the final by three sets to two.

Results

See also
List of World Table Tennis Championships medalists

References

-